Melampus sincaporensis is a species of small air-breathing salt marsh snail, a pulmonate gastropod mollusk in the family Ellobiidae.

Distribution 
The distribution of this species includes Japan and India.

The conservation status of Melampus sincaporensis in Japan is vulnerable.

Description
The size of an adult shell varies between 5 mm and 10 mm.

References

 Lozouet P. & Plaziat J.C. (2008) Mangrove environments and molluscs. Abatan River, Bohol and Panglao Islands, central Philippines. Hackenheim: Conchbooks. 160 pp.

External links 
 Kyoto Museum info
 

Ellobiidae
Gastropods described in 1855